Vážany may refer to places in the Czech Republic:

Vážany (Blansko District), a municipality and village in the South Moravian Region
Vážany (Uherské Hradiště District), a municipality and village in the Zlín Region
Vážany (Vyškov District), a municipality and village in the South Moravian Region
Vážany, a village and part of Kroměříž in the Zlín Region
Vážany nad Litavou, a municipality and village in the South Moravian Region
Královopolské Vážany, a village and part of Rousínov in the South Moravian Region